Marie Bizet (1905–1998) was a French actress and singer.

Selected filmography
 Lights of Paris (1938)
 Sing Anyway (1940)
 The Three Cousins (1947)
 I due derelitti (1951)

References

Bibliography 
 Jacob Paskins. Paris Under Construction: Building Sites and Urban Transformation in The 1960s. Routledge, 2015.

External links 
 

1905 births
1998 deaths
French film actresses
Actresses from Paris
20th-century French women singers